Umurköy can refer to:

 Umurköy, Çine
 Umurköy, Silvan